Blázni, vodníci a podvodníci is a 1980 Czechoslovak film. The film is a comedy following protagonist siblings Zuzana (played by actress Dagmar Havlová) and Petr (played by actor Jiří Lábus). The film also starred Josef Kemr.

References

External links
 

1980 films
1980s Czech-language films
Czechoslovak comedy films
1980s Czech films